Sharbash (Şarbaş) is a rural locality (a village) in Kilimovsky Selsoviet, Buzdyaksky District, Bashkortostan, Russia. The population was 120 as of 2010. There is 1 street.

Geography 
Sharbash is located 25 km north of Buzdyak (the district's administrative centre) by road. Volodarskoye is the nearest rural locality.

References 

Rural localities in Buzdyaksky District